The Martian Piloted Complex or MPK was a Soviet Union human mission to Mars proposed in 1956-62 by Mikhail Tikhonravov. It featured a six-Cosmonaut crew on a 900-day mission, with a launch in 1975.

The craft would have a mass of 1,630 metric tons and land a crew on Mars for a one-year expedition. It would take 25 N1 rocket launches to assemble the MPK.

See also

References

External links
 MPK page

Soviet Mars missions
Cancelled Soviet spacecraft
Human missions to Mars